100. Yıl or Yüzüncüyıl is a village in the Adıyaman District, Adıyaman Province, Turkey. The village had a population of 68 in 2022.

The village is mostly engaged in agriculture and animal husbandry but has in recent years experienced emigration due to increased temperature. The villagers moreover criticized the authorities for lack of support.

Population 
Population history from 2008 to 2022:

References 

Villages in Adıyaman District
Kurdish settlements in Adıyaman Province